The 2018 Northern Colorado Bears football team, represented the University of Northern Colorado in the 2018 NCAA Division I FCS football season. They were led by eighth-year head coach Earnest Collins Jr. and played their home games at Nottingham Field. They were a member of the Big Sky Conference. They finished the season 2–9, 2–6 in Big Sky play to finish in 11th place.

Previous season
The Bears finished the 2017 season 3–7, 2–6 in Big Sky play to finish in a three-way tie for ninth place.

Preseason

Polls
On July 16, 2018 during the Big Sky Kickoff in Spokane, Washington, the Bears were predicted to finish in eleventh place in the coaches poll and twelfth place in the media poll.

Preseason All-Conference Team
The Bears had one player selected to the Preseason All-Conference Team.

Alex Wesley – Sr. WR

Schedule

Source: Schedule

Despite also being a member of the Big Sky, the game vs. Sacramento State will be a non-conference game and will have no effect on the Big Sky standings.

Game summaries

McNeese State

at South Dakota

Sacramento State

at Weber State

North Dakota

UC Davis

at Portland State

Northern Arizona

at Southern Utah

Eastern Washington

at Montana State

References

Northern Colorado
Northern Colorado Bears football seasons
Northern Colorado Bears football